Richard "Beaver Dick" Leigh (9 January 1831, Manchester – 29 March 1899, Wilford, Idaho) was an English-American trapper, scout, and guide at the end of the 19th century, primarily in the area now known as Jackson Hole, Wyoming, United States. He has been called "possibly the West's last mountain man." He was the guide for F. V. Hayden's survey of the Teton Range in 1872. Leigh Lake was named for Richard Leigh, and nearby Jenny Lake for his first wife, by Hayden's expedition. He corresponded frequently with his longtime friend, Charles B. Penrose, leaving behind diaries and letters that provide a personal, historical, and geographical documentation of the area. He was mentioned by Theodore Roosevelt in 1892, as a local hunter around Two Ocean Pass. His moniker "Beaver Dick" was reportedly given to him by Brigham Young as a tribute to his trapping skills.  In 1964, Beaver Dick Park was established near Rexburg, Idaho. Despite what the New York Times reported, it has never been an Idaho State Park.

Letter from Beaver Dick Leigh describing the smallpox sickness and deaths of Jenny and five children can be found in Margaret and Olaus Murie’s book Wapiti Wilderness, p. 89.

References

1831 births
1899 deaths
American fur traders
English emigrants to the United States
People from Manchester
People from Jackson Hole, Wyoming
Mountain men